Negovan is a village in central western Bulgaria, part of the Capital Municipality of Sofia City Province, and is regarded as a suburban  neighbourhood of Sofia.

Notes

Villages in Sofia City Province